One Arranged Murder is the ninth novel and the twelfth book overall written by the Indian author Chetan Bhagat. The novel is the sequel to Bhagat's 2018 novel The Girl in Room 105. A sequel to the book named 400 Days was released in 2021

Summary 
Saurabh Maheshwari is engaged to Prerna Malhotra. His wedding is three months away. On the night of Karva Chauth, however, Prerna is murdered after being pushed from her terrace. With Inspector Vijender sss Singh and aided by ACP Rana, the case is investigated by Saurabh and Keshav Rajpurohit. They interrogate all the people in the family. Prerna has a cousin sister called Anjali, and Keshav falls in love with her. Anjali is revealed to be the killer and is arrested.

References

External links 

Novels by Chetan Bhagat
2020 Indian novels